The Get Loose Tour was the third concert tour by Canadian singer-songwriter Nelly Furtado. The tour showcased material from her third studio album, Loose (2006). A live album, Loose: The Concert, originated from the April 4, 2007, concert in Toronto.

Background
After Loose garnered considerable sales and attention, Nelly Furtado announced a tour of Europe and North America.  Nelly stated:

The set consisted of a white stage, a multi-leveled band setup with LCD screens, two parallel multi-story white palm trees, a large LED screen, and a white stage curtain.

Furtado was backed by four dancers and her six-piece band, including Toronto rapper Saukrates on percussion who also fills in for Loose producer Timbaland on some of the tracks from Loose.

The Get Loose Tour started in Europe with 23 shows over five weeks. The Canadian leg began shortly afterward in Victoria, B.C. (Furtado's birthplace) where the mayor proclaimed March 21 as Nelly Furtado Day.  After the first leg was completed plans were announced for Furtado to visit the United States.

The second leg in the United States consisted of a more budget production.  The LED screen was replaced by a light-up disco ball, the white curtains were replaced by a large LED sheet, and most notably the palm trees vanished.  Furtado also wore her hair differently for these shows and changed her costumes.

The third leg consisted of a number of open air festivals during the summer season in Europe.  Costumes for this leg of the tour were provided by a famous French designer.

Setlist
"Say It Right"
"Turn off the Light"
"Powerless (Say What You Want)"
"Do It" / "Wait for You"
"Showtime"
"Crazy"
"In God's Hands"
"Try"
"All Good Things (Come to an End)"
"Give it to Me"
"I'm like a Bird"
"Glow" / "Heart of Glass"
"Força"
"Promiscuous"
"Party" / "No Hay Igual"
"Maneater"

Shows

Notes

References

Nelly Furtado concert tours
2007 concert tours
2008 concert tours
2006 concert tours